The 1923 Princeton Tigers football team represented Princeton University in the 1923 college football season. The team finished with a 3–3–1 record under 10th-year head coach Bill Roper. No Princeton players were first-team honorees on the 1923 College Football All-America Team.

Schedule

References

Princeton
Princeton Tigers football seasons
Princeton Tigers football